Alison Silva (born 1 July 1988 in Palmeiras) is a Brazilian football player who plays for FC Volgar Astrakhan in the Russian First Division.

External links
 

1988 births
Living people
Brazilian footballers
Association football forwards
Clube Atlético do Porto players
Fehérvár FC players
Ferencvárosi TC footballers
FC Volgar Astrakhan players
FK Klaipėdos Granitas players
Nemzeti Bajnokság I players
Brazilian expatriate footballers
Expatriate footballers in Hungary
Brazilian expatriate sportspeople in Hungary
Expatriate footballers in Russia
Brazilian expatriate sportspeople in Russia